is a district of Nakano, Tokyo, Japan.

As of October 2020, the population of this district is 18,431. The postal code for Arai is 165-0026.

Geography
Arai borders Numabukuro in the north, Kamitakada to the east, Nakano to the south, and Nogata to the west.

Education
Nakano City Board of Education (中野区教育委員会) operates public elementary and junior high schools.

Schools in Arai:
 Heiwa-no-Mori Elementary School (中野区立平和の森小学校)

Areas zoned to Heiwa-no-Mori ES include all of 2-chome and part of 3-chome. Reiwa Elementary School (令和小学校)'s zone includes 4 and 5-chome and parts 1-chome and 3-chome. The rest of 1-chome is zoned to Momozono No. 2 Elementary (桃園第二小学校). No.5 Junior High School's zone includes all of 4 and 5-chome, and parts of 1 and 3-chome. Nakano Junior High School (中野中学校)'s zone includes parts of 1 and 2-chome. Midorino Junior High School (緑野中学校)'s zone includes parts of 2 and 3-chome.

References

Neighborhoods of Tokyo
Nakano, Tokyo